"I can't breathe" is a slogan associated with the predominantly American political movement Black Lives Matter, particularly with the killings of Eric Garner and George Floyd by police, as well as with broader issues of police brutality and racial inequality.

I Can't Breathe may also refer to:

Literature 
 I Can't Breathe: A Killing on Bay Street, a 2017 book by Matt Taibbi about the killing of Eric Garner

Music 
 "I Can't Breathe", a song from 24Hours's 2013 album, Party People
 "I Can't Breathe", a song from Aminata Savadogo's 2015 album, Inner Voice
 "I Can't Breathe", a song from Audiovent's 2002 album, Dirty Sexy Knights in Paris
 "I Can't Breathe", a song from Bea Miller's 2017 EP, Chapter One: Blue
 "I Can't Breathe", a song from Bruce Kulick's 2003 album, Transformer
 "I Can't Breathe", a song from Cold as Life's 2000 album, Declination of Independence
 "I Can't Breathe", a song from Dead by April's 2017 album, Worlds Collide
 "I Can't Breathe", a song from Edgewater's 2006 album, We're Not Robots...
 "I Can't Breathe", a song from Gary Numan's 2004 album, Hope Bleeds
 "I Can't Breathe" (H.E.R. song), a 2020 song
 "I Can't Breathe", a song from Jang Wooyoung's 2017 album, It Is Still...
 "I Can't Breathe" (Jerome Farah song), a 2020 song
 "I Can't Breathe", a song from Krypteria's 2007 album, Bloodangel's Cry
 "I Can't Breathe", a song about Garner's death from Kxng Crooked's 2014 album, Sex, Money and Hip-Hop
 "I Can't Breathe", a song from Masc's 2016 album, Strange
 "I Can't Breathe", a song from the New Seekers's 2009 album, It's Been Too Long – Greatest Hits and More
 "I Can't Breathe", a song from Parker McCollum's 2017 album, Probably Wrong
 "I Can't Breathe", a 2015 song and video by Pussy Riot
 "I Can't Breathe", a song from Skrape's 2004 album, Up the Dose
 "I Can't Breathe", a song from Stitched Up Heart's 2016 album, Never Alone
 "I Can't Breathe", a song from Tickle Me Pink's 2007 album, Madeline
 "I Can't Breathe", a song from Trust Company's 2008 compilation album, Unreleased
 "I Can't Breathe", a song from Tyler Woods's 2009 album, The R&B Sensation
 "I Can't Breathe", a song from Vampires Everywhere!'s 2012 album, Hellbound and Heartless

Television 
 "I Can't Breathe", a 1949 episode of the TV series Actors Studio
 "I Can't Breathe", a 2011 episode of the TV series Hoarding: Buried Alive
 "I Can't Breathe", a 2001 episode of the TV series True Life

See also
 Dad, I Can't Breathe, a 1995 album by the Boils
 "I Can't Breathe Anymore", a 1978 song by David Gilmour
 "I Just Can't Breathe...", a 2010 song by the Brilliant Green
 Can't Breathe (disambiguation)
 Choke (disambiguation)
 Suffocation (disambiguation)